Stowe-by-Chartley is a village and civil parish in the Borough of Stafford, Staffordshire, England.

According to the parish council, the parish includes Amerton, Chartley, Grindley and Drointon.  The village and civil parish of Hixon is to the south, and East Staffordshire district borders the parish to the east.

At St John the Baptist's church in Stowe-by-Chartley is a plaque  by Sir Edwin Lutyens to the memory of Billy Congreve VC, DSO, MC (1891–1916) recipient of the Victoria Cross

Notable people 
 Charles Lucas (1843 in Stowe-by-Chartley – 1919) an English first-class cricketer who played for Hampshire 
 Rupert Evans (actor, born 1976)

See also
 Listed buildings in Stowe-by-Chartley
 Chartley Castle
 Chartley Castle Tournament 
 Chartley railway station

References

External links
 Stowe by Chartley Parish Council website

Villages in Staffordshire